Pinene is a collection of unsaturated bicyclic monoterpenes. Two geometric isomers of pinene are found in nature, α-pinene and β-pinene. Both are chiral. As the name suggests, pinenes are found in pines.  Specifically, pinene is the major component of the liquid extracts of conifers. Pinenes are also found in many non-coniferous plants such as camphorweed (Heterotheca) and big sagebrush (Artemisia tridentata).

Isomers

Biosynthesis 
α-Pinene and β-pinene are both produced from geranyl pyrophosphate, via cyclisation of linaloyl pyrophosphate followed by loss of a proton from the carbocation equivalent. Researchers at the Georgia Institute of Technology and the Joint BioEnergy Institute have been able to synthetically produce pinene with a bacterium.

Plants
Alpha-pinene is the most widely encountered terpenoid in nature and is highly repellent to insects.

Alpha-pinene appears in conifers and numerous other plants. Pinene is a major component of the essential oils of Sideritis spp. (ironwort) and
Salvia spp. (sage). Cannabis also contains alpha-pinene and beta-pinene. Resin from Pistacia terebinthus (commonly known as terebinth or turpentine tree) is rich in pinene. Pine nuts produced by pine trees contain pinene.

Makrut lime fruit peel contains an essential oil comparable to lime fruit peel oil; its main components are limonene and β-pinene.

The racemic mixture of the two forms of pinene is found in some oils like eucalyptus oil.

Reactions 
β-Pinene can be converted to α-pinene in the presence of strong bases.

Selective oxidation of pinene occurs at the allylic position to give verbenone, along with pinene oxide, as well as verbenol and its hydroperoxide.

Hydrogenation of pinene gives pinane, precursor to a useful pinanehydroperoxide.  

The hydroboration of α-pinene has been extensively examined. With borane-dimethylsulfide, two equivalents of α-pinene react to give (diisopinocampheyl)borane. Reaction with 9-BBN gives the reagent called alpine borane. This sterically crowded chiral trialkylborane can stereoselectively reduce aldehydes in what is known as the Midland Alpine borane reduction.

Use
Pinenes, especially α, are the primary constituents of turpentine, a nature-derived solvent and fuel.

The use of pinene as a biofuel in spark ignition engines has been explored. Pinene dimers have been shown to have heating values comparable to the jet fuel JP-10.

References

Bibliography 
 

Monoterpenes
Cyclobutanes
Cyclohexenes